Chinese exploration includes exploratory Chinese travels abroad, on land and by sea, from the travels of Han dynasty diplomat Zhang Qian into Central Asia during the 2nd century BC until the Ming dynasty treasure voyages of the 15th century that crossed the Indian Ocean and reached as far as East Africa.

Land exploration

Pamir Mountains and beyond 

The Western Han envoy Zhang Qian traveled beyond the Tarim Basin in the 2nd century BC, introducing the Chinese to the kingdoms of Central Asia, Hellenized Persia, India, and the Middle East in search of allies against the Xiongnu.

From 104 to 102 BC, Emperor Wu of Han waged war against the "Yuezhi" who controlled "Dayuan", a Hellenized kingdom of Fergana established by Macedonian king Alexander the Great in 329 BC. Emperor Wu also expanded Han territories beyond the Gansu corridor into the Western Regions, in what is now Xinjiang. Han military control of the region was established with the Protectorate of the Western Regions, but the Tarim Basin states were only loosely under Han control as tributary vassals on the western frontier.

Gan Ying, the emissary of General Ban Chao, perhaps traveled as far as Roman Syria in the late 1st century AD. After these initial discoveries, the focus of Chinese exploration shifted to the maritime sphere, although the Silk Road leading all the way to Europe continued to be China's most lucrative source of trade.

The pilgrimage of the Buddhist monk Xuanzang from Chang'an to Nalanda in India not only greatly increased the knowledge of Buddhism in China  returning more than 650 texts including the Heart and the Perfection of Wisdom Sutras  and inspired the immensely influential novel Journey to the West, but it also led to Xuanzang's publication of the Great Tang Records on the Western Regions, a text which introduced China to Indian cities such as the port of Calicut and recorded many details of 7th-century Bengal for posterity.

Maritime exploration

South China Sea 
Before the advent of the Chinese-invented mariner's compass in the 11th century, the seasonal monsoon winds controlled navigation, blowing north from the equatorial zone in the summer and south in the winter. This most likely accounts for the ease with which Neolithic travelers from mainland China were able to settle on the island of Taiwan in prehistoric times. After defeating the last of the Warring States and consolidating an empire over China proper, the Chinese navy of the Qin dynasty period (221–206 BC) assisted the land-borne invasion of Guangzhou and northern Vietnam. (Called first Jiaozhi and then Annan, the northern half of Vietnam would not become fully independent from Chinese rule until AD 938.) In 1975, an ancient shipyard excavated in Guangzhou was dated to the early Han dynasty (202 BC  AD 220) and, with three platforms, was able to construct ships that were approximately 30 m (98 ft) in length, 8 m (26 ft) in width, and could hold a weight of 60 metric tons.

During the Three Kingdoms, travellers from Eastern Wu are known to have explored the coast. The most important were Zhu Ying (朱應) and Kang Tai, both sent by the Governor of Guangzhou and Jiaozhi Lü Dai in the early 3rd century. Although each wrote a book, both were lost by the 11th century: Zhu's Record of the Curiosities of Phnom (t , s , Fúnán Yìwù Zhì) in its entirety and Kang's Tales of Foreign Countries During the Wu Period (t , s , Wúshí Wàiguó Zhuàn) only surviving in scattered references in other works, including the Shuijing Zhu and the Yiwen Leiju.

Later, during the Eastern Jin, a rebel known as Lu Xun managed to fend off an attack by the imperial army for a hundred days in 403 before sailing down into the South China Sea from a coastal commandery. For six years, he occupied Panyu, the largest southern seaport of that time.

South East Asia 
Between the 15th and 18th centuries, much of South-east Asia was explored by Chinese merchants. Some parts of Malaysia were settled by Chinese families at this time, and Chinese garrisons established Similarly, some Chinese traders settled in north Java in the 1400s, and after China legitimized foreign trade again in 1567 (licensing 50 junks a year), hundreds of Chinese trade colonies developed in what is now Malaysia, Indonesia and the Philippines.

Indian Ocean and beyond 

Chinese envoys sailed into the Indian Ocean from the late 2nd century BC, and reportedly reached Kanchipuram, known as Huangzhi (黄支) to them, or otherwise Ethiopia as asserted by Ethiopian scholars. During the late 4th and early 5th centuries, Chinese pilgrims like Faxian, Zhiyan, and Tanwujie began to travel to India by sea, bringing Buddhist scriptures and sutras back to China. By the 7th century, as many as 31 recorded Chinese monks, including I Ching, managed to reach India the same way. In 674, the private explorer Daxi Hongtong was one of the first explorers to end his journey at the southern tip of the Arabian Peninsula, after traveling through 36 countries which were located west of the South China Sea.

Chinese seafaring merchants and diplomats who lived during the medieval Tang dynasty (618–907) and Song dynasty (960–1279) often sailed into the Indian Ocean after visiting ports in South East Asia. Chinese sailors would travel to Malaya, India, Sri Lanka, into the Persian Gulf and up the Euphrates River in modern-day Iraq, to the Arabian peninsula and into the Red Sea, stopping to trade goods in Ethiopia and Egypt (as Chinese porcelain was highly valued in old Fustat, Cairo).
Jia Dan wrote Route between Guangzhou and the Barbarian Sea during the late 8th century that documented foreign communications, the book was lost, but the Xin Tangshu retained some of his passages about the three sea-routes linking China to East Africa. Jia Dan also wrote about tall lighthouse minarets in the Persian Gulf, which were confirmed a century later by Ali al-Masudi and al-Muqaddasi. Beyond the initial work of Jia Dan, other Chinese writers accurately described Africa from the 9th century onwards; For example, Duan Chengshi wrote in 863 of the slave trade, ivory trade, and ambergris trade of Berbera, Somalia. Seaports in China such as Guangzhou and Quanzhou – the most cosmopolitan urban centers in the medieval world – hosted thousands of foreign travelers and permanent settlers. Chinese junk ships were even described by the Moroccan geographer Al-Idrisi in his Geography of 1154, along with the usual goods they traded and carried aboard their vessels.

From 1405 to 1433, large fleets commanded by Admiral Zheng He – under the auspices of the Yongle Emperor of the Ming dynasty – traveled to the Indian Ocean seven times. This attempt did not lead China to global expansion, as the Confucian bureaucracy under the next emperor reversed the policy of open exploration and by 1500, it became a capital offence to build a seagoing junk with more than two masts. Chinese merchants became content trading with already existing tributary states nearby and abroad. To them, traveling far east into the Pacific Ocean represented entering a broad wasteland of water with uncertain benefits of trade.

Exchanges

Chinese Muslims traditionally credit the Muslim traveler Sa`d ibn Abi Waqqas with introducing Islam to China in 650, during the reign of Emperor Gaozong of Tang, although modern secular scholars did not find any historical evidence for him actually travelling to China. There exists documentation that in 1008 the Fatimid Egyptian sea-captain Domiyat, in the name of his ruling Imam Al-Hakim bi-Amr Allah, travelled to the Buddhist pilgrimage-site in Shandong in order to seek out Emperor Zhenzong of Song with gifts from his court. This reestablished diplomatic ties between China and Egypt which had been broken since the Five Dynasties and Ten Kingdoms period (907–960). The trade embassy of the Indian ruler Kulothunga Chola I to the court of Emperor Shenzong of Song in 1077 proved an economic benefactor for both empires.

Technique 
In China, the invention of the stern-mounted rudder appeared as early as the 1st century AD, allowing for better steering than using the power of oarsmen. The Cao Wei Kingdom engineer and inventor Ma Jun (c. 200–265 AD) built the first south-pointing chariot, a complex mechanical device that incorporated a differential gear in order to navigate on land, and (as one 6th century text alludes) by sea as well. Much later the Chinese polymath scientist Shen Kuo (1031–1095 AD) was the first to describe the magnetic needle-compass, along with its usefulness for accurate navigation by discovering the concept of true north. In his Pingzhou Table Talks of 1119 AD the Song dynasty maritime author Zhu Yu described the use of separate bulkhead compartments in the hulls of Chinese ships. This allowed for water-tight conditions and ability of a ship not to sink if one part of the hull became damaged.

See also 

 Silk Road
 Age of Discovery
 Maritime history
 Naval history
 Chinese geography
 Fusang
 Naval history of China
 List of Chinese discoveries
 Zheng He
 Gavin Menzies, known for claiming that Chinese explorers discovered America in the 15th century
 Pre-Columbian trans-oceanic contact theories#Claims of Chinese contact
 List of China-related topics
 Arcadio Huang, a 17th-century Chinese visitor to Europe
 Fan Shouyi, an 18th-century Chinese visitor to Europe
 Michael Shen Fu-Tsung, a 17th-century Chinese visitor to Europe
 Wang Dayuan, a Chinese visitor to North Africa in the 14th century
 A Record of Buddhist Practices Sent Home from the Southern Sea
 Great Tang Records on the Western Regions

References

Citations

Sources 

 Bowman, John S. (2000). Columbia Chronologies of Asian History and Culture. New York: Columbia University Press.
 Chen, Yan (2002). Maritime Silk Route and Chinese-Foreign Cultural Exchanges. Beijing: Peking University Press. .
 Fairbank, John King and Merle Goldman (1992). China: A New History; Second Enlarged Edition (2006). Cambridge: MA; London: The Belknap Press of Harvard University Press. 
 Levathes (1994). When China Ruled the Seas. New York: Simon & Schuster. .
Needham, Joseph (1986). Science and Civilization in China: Volume 4, Physics and Physical Technology, Part 2, Mechanical Engineering. Taipei: Caves Books Ltd.
 Needham, Joseph (1986). Science and Civilization in China: Volume 4, Physics and Physical Technology, Part 3, Civil Engineering and Nautics. Taipei: Caves Books Ltd.
 Sastri, Nilakanta, K.A. The CōĻas, University of Madras, Madras, 1935 (Reprinted 1984).
 Shen, Fuwei (1996). Cultural flow between China and the outside world. Beijing: Foreign Languages Press. .
 Sivin, Nathan (1995). Science in Ancient China: Researches and Reflections. Brookfield, Vermont: VARIORUM, Ashgate Publishing.
 Sun, Guangqi (1989). History of Navigation in Ancient China. Beijing: Ocean Press. .
 Wang, Zhongshu. (1982). Han Civilization. Translated by K.C. Chang and Collaborators. New Haven and London: Yale University Press. .

Maritime history of China
History of foreign trade in China
History of the foreign relations of China
Chinese explorers
Ancient international relations